"Fountain of Age" is a science fiction novella published in 2007 by Nancy Kress.  It won the 2008 Nebula Award for Best Novella and was nominated for the 2008 Hugo Award for Best Novella.

Plot summary
The story is about Max Feder, a wealthy reformed criminal who tries to contact his now-famous former lover, Daria, whose brain tumors have the ability to generate spare stem cells.

Footnotes

External links 
 

Science fiction short stories
2007 science fiction novels
Works originally published in Asimov's Science Fiction
Nebula Award for Best Novella-winning works
Works by Nancy Kress